Mary Montagu, Duchess of Montagu may refer to:

 Mary Montagu, Duchess of Montagu (1689–1751)
 Mary Montagu, Duchess of Montagu (1711–1775)